|}

This is a list of results for the Legislative Council at the 1979 South Australian state election.

Continuing members 

The following MLCs were not up for re-election this year.

Election results

See also
 Candidates of the 1979 South Australian state election
 Members of the South Australian Legislative Council, 1979–1982

References

1979
1979 elections in Australia
1970s in South Australia